Media Luna is a town and municipality in the Granma Province of Cuba. It is located on the coastal region of the province, bordering the Gulf of Guacanayabo, between Niquero and Campechuela.

Demographics
In 2004, the municipality of Media Luna had a population of 35,330.

Transport
The town is crossed by the state highway "Circuito Sur de Oriente" (CSO).

See also
Municipalities of Cuba
List of cities in Cuba

References

External links

Populated places in Granma Province